This is a list of compositions by the English composer Hubert Parry (1848–1918). Dates of composition are indicated by "c.", and of publication by "p."

Opera
 Guinevere (libretto by Una Taylor), c. 1885–86

Incidental music
 The Birds (Aristophanes), c. 1883?, p. 1880?
 The Frogs (Aristophanes), c. 1891, p. 1892
 Hypatia (Stuart Ogilvie), c. for production Jan. 1893
 A Repentance (Teresa Craigie), c. for production Feb. 1899
 Agamemnon (Aeschylus), c. for production Feb. 1900, p. 1900
 The Clouds (Aristophanes), c. for production 1905, p. 1905
 Proserpine (Keats), c. 1912
 The Acharnians (Aristophanes), c. 1914, p. 1914

Choral

Church music
 Anthem "Blessed is He", c. 1864, p. 1865
 Te Deum and Benedictus in D ma, c. 1866–68, p. 1868
 Morning, Evening and Communion Service (fragment), c. 1868, p, 1869
 Anthem for chorus & orchestra, "Hear my words, ye people", c. 1894, p. 1894
 Magnificat in F major for soprano, chorus & orchestra, c. 1897, p. 1897
 Te Deum in F major for soprano, bass, chorus & orchestra (Latin words), c. 1900, p. 1900; (English words) p. 1903
 Hymn, "God of all created things", p. 1902
 Anthem "I was glad" and processional music for Edward VII's coronation, c. 1902, p. 1903
 Motet "Voces clamantium H" for soprano, bass, chorus & orchestra, c. 1903, p. 1903
 Hymn "Crossing the bar" (Tennyson), p. 1903
 Hymn-tune "Through the night of doubt and sorrow", p. 1904
 Motet "Beyond these voices there is peace" for soprano, bass, chorus & orchestra, c. 1908, p. 1908
 Hymn-tune "O Sylvan Prophet" (Dryden), p. 1910
 Te Deum in D major for chorus & orch, c. 1911, p. 1911
 Psalm 46, "God is our hope" for bass, double chorus

Choral works (with orchestra)
 Oratorio "O Lord, Thou hast cast us out" (Exercise for B.Mus., Oxon.), c. 1865, p. 1876
 Scenes from Shelley's "Prometheus Unbound" for contr., tenor, bass, chorus & orchestra, p. 1880
 Ode from Shirley's "The Contention of Ajax and Ulysses", "The glories of our blood and state" for chorus & orchestra, c. 1883, p. 1885; revised 1914
 Ode at a Solemn Music "Blest pair of sirens" (Milton) for chorus and orchestra, p. 1887
 Oratorio "Judith" for solo voices, chorus & orchestra, p. 1888
 "Ode on St. Cecilia's Day" (Pope) for soprano, bass, chorus & orchestra p. 1889
 "L'Allegro ed il Penseroso" (Milton) for soprano, bass, chorus & orchestra p. 1890
 Ode "Eton" (Swinburne) for chorus & orchestra c. 1891, p. 1891
 "De Profundis" for soprano, 12-part chorus & orchestra p. 1891
 Choric Song from Tennyson's "Lotus Eaters" for soprano, chorus & orchestra p. 1892
 Oratorio "Job" for solo voices, chorus & orchestra p. 1892
 Oratorio "King Saul" for solo voices, chorus & orchestra p. 1894
 "Invocation to Music" (Bridges) for soprano, tenor, bass, chorus & orchestra p. 1895
 "A Song of Darkness and Light" (Bridges) for soprano, chorus & orchestra p. 1898
 "Ode to Music" (A. C. Benson) for soprano, tenor, bass, chorus & orchestra p. 1901
 Symphonic Ode "War and Peace" (A. Benson & Parry) for solo voices, chorus & orchestra p. 1903
 "Sinfonia sacra", "Love that casteth out fear" for chorus & orchestra p. 1904
 "The Pied Piper of Hamelin" (Browning) for tenor, bass, chorus & orchestra p. 1905
 "Sinfonia sacra", "The Soul's Ransom" for soprano, bass, chorus & orchestra p. 1906
 Symphonic poem, "A Vision of Life" for soprano, bass, chorus & orchestra p. 1907; revised 1914
 "Eton Memorial Ode" (Bridges) for chorus & orchestra p. 1908
 "Ode on the Nativity" (Dunbar) for soprano, chorus & orchestra p. 1912
 Naval Ode "The Chivalry of the Sea" (Bridges) for chorus & orchestra p. 1916

Choral works (unaccompanied)
 Madrigal "Fair daffodils" (5 parts) (Herrick), c. 1866, p. 1866
 Christmas Carol "He is coming" (Mrs. H. Gladstone) p. 1874
 Three Trios for female voices, p. 1875
 Unison Song "Land to the Leeward Ho!" (Margaret Preston), p. 1895
 Partsongs, p. 1897
 Eight Four-part Songs, p. 1898
 Five-part Song, "Who can dwell with greatness" (Austin Dobson), p. 1900
 "Ode to Newfoundland" (Sir Cavendish Boyle), national anthem of the Dominion of Newfoundland and now the provincial anthem of Newfoundland and Labrador, c. 1902–04
 Four-part and eight-part Song, "In Praise of Song" (Parry), p. 1904
 "Von edler Art" (Nuremberg Song-book of 1549, trans. by Paul England), p. 1906
 Seven Partsongs for male voices p. 1910
 Madrigal "La Belle Dame sans merci" (5 parts) (Keats), p, c. 1914
 Carol "When Christ was born" (Harleian MS), p. 1915
 Choral song "And did those feet in ancient time" ("Jerusalem") (Blake), p. 1916
 Six Motets, Songs of Farewell p. 1916–1918 [1. My soul, there is a country (SATB) / words by Henry Vaughan. 2. I know my soul hath power (SATB) / words by John Davies. 3. Never weather-beaten sail (SSATB) / words by Thomas Campion. 4. There is an old belief (SSATBB) / words by John Gibson Lockhart. 5. At the round earth's imagined corners (SSAATTBB) / words by John Donne. 6. Lord, let me know mine end (SATB/SATB) / words from Psalm 39]
 Two Carols, p. 1917
 Three School Songs, p. 1918
 Unison Song "England", p. 1919

Orchestral works
 "Allegretto scherzando" in E major c. 1867
 "Intermezzo religioso" c. 1868
 Overture, "Vivien" (lost), c. 1873
 Overture, Guillem de Cabestanh, c. 1878–79
 Piano Concerto in F-sharp c. 1878–79
 Symphony No. 1 in G major c. 1878–82
 Symphony No. 2 in F major ("Cambridge"), c. 1883, p. 1900
 "Suite moderne" c. 1886
 Symphony No. 3 in C major ("English"), c. 1889, p. 1907
 Symphony No. 4 in E minor c. 1889, p. 1921
 "Overture to an Unwritten Tragedy" c. 1893, p. 1893
 "Lady Radnor's Suite" for strings c. 1894, p. 1902
 Elegy for Brahms, A minor p. 1897
 Symphonic Variations, c. 1897, p. 1897
 Symphony Fantasy (Symphony No. 5) in B minor "1912" c. 1912, p. 1922
 Symphonic Poem in 2 connected movements (first called "From Death to Life"), c. 1914
 "An English Suite" for strings (posthumous), p. 1921

Voice and orchestra
 Scena for baritone, "The Soldier's Tent", c. 1900, p. 1900

Chamber music
 String Quartet No. 1, in G minor c. 1867
 Short Trios for violin, viola & pianoforte c. 1868
 String Quartet No. 2, in C minor c. 1868
 Nonet in B-flat major for wind instruments, c. 1877 p. 1988
 Trio in E minor for violin, cello & pianoforte c. 1878, p. 1879
 Quartet in A-flat major for violin, viola, cello & pianoforte c. 1879, p. 1884
 String Quartet No. 3, in G major c. 1878–80 p. 1995
 String Quintet in E-flat major c. 1884, p. 1909
 Trio in B minor for violin, cello & pianoforte p. 1884
 Trio in G major for violin, cello & pianoforte c. 1884–90

Violin and pianoforte
 Partita in D minor c. 1877–86, p. 1890
 Fantasy-Sonata in B minor c. 1878
 Sonata in D major, 1889
 Twelve Short Pieces p. 1895
 Suite in D major p. 1907
 Suite in F major p. 1907

Violoncello and pianoforte
 Sonata in A major p. 1883

Keyboard

Pianoforte solo
 "Sonnets and Songs without Words", Set I, p. 1869
 "Sonnets and Songs without Words", Set II c. 1867 and later, p. 1875
 Seven "Charakterbilder" c. 1872, p. 1872
 Sonata No. 1, in F major c. 1877, p. 1877
 "Sonnets and Songs without Words", Set III c. 1877 and later
 Sonata No. 2, in A major p. 1878
 Theme and 19 Variations in D minor c. 1878–85, p. 1885
 "Shulbrede Tunes", 10 Pieces, p. 1914
 Suite "Hands across the Centuries" p. 1918
 Five Miniatures (posthumous), p. 1926

Pianoforte duet
 Characteristic Popular Tunes of the British Isles, c. 1885, p. 1887

Two pianofortes
 Grand Duo in E minor c. 1875–76, p. 1877

Organ
 Seven Chorale Preludes, p. 1912
 Fantasia and Fugue in G, p. 1913
 Elegy in A-flat major c. 1913, p. 1922
 Three Chorale Fantasies, p. 1915
 Seven Chorale Preludes, p. 1916
 Toccata and Fugue in G major and E minor, "The Wanderer" (posthumous), p. 1921
 Elegie in C. (1918), p. 2018

Songs
 "Why does azure deck the sky?" (Thomas Moore), c. 1865–66, p. 1866
 "Autumn" (Thomas Hood), c. ? 1866, p. 1867
 "Angel hosts, sweet love, befriend thee" (Lord Francis Hervey), p. 1867
 "The River of Life" (Lord Pembroke), p. 1870
 Three Songs, c. 1873, p. 1873
 "Twilight" (Lord Pembroke), c. 1874, p. 1875
 "A Garland of Old-fashioned Songs", c. 1873–81, p. 1874 & 1881
 Four Sonnets (Shakespeare), c. 1873–82, p. 1887
 Sonnet, "If thou survive my well-contented day" (Shakespeare), c. 1874
 3 Odes of Anacreon (trans. Moore), c. 1869–78, p. 1880
 "English Lyrics", Set I, c. 1881–85
 "English Lyrics", Set II (Shakespeare), p. 1886
 "The Maid of Elsinore" (Harold Boulton), p. 1891
 Children's song, "Rock a bye", c. 1893, p. 1893
 "English Lyrics", Set III, p. 1895
 "English Lyrics", Set IV, p. 1897
 "English Lyrics", Set V, p. 1902
 "English Lyrics", Set VI, p. 1902
 "Fear no more the heat of the sun" (Shakespeare), p. 1905
 "English Lyrics", Set VII, p. 1907
 "English Lyrics", Set VIII, p. 1907
 "The Laird of Cockpen" (Lady Nairn) for baritone, c. 1906, p. 1907
 "English Lyrics", Set IX (Mary Coleridge), p. 1909
 "A Hymn for Aviators" (Mary C. D. Hamilton), c. 1915, p. 1915
 "English Lyrics", Set X, c. 1909, p. 1918
 "English Lyrics", Set XI, p. 1920 (posthumously)
 "English Lyrics", Set XII, p. 1920 (posthumously)

References

External links

 
Parry, Hubert